Events in the year 1861 in Norway.

Incumbents
Monarch: Charles IV

Events

Arts and literature
Ferdaminni fraa Sumaren 1860 (A remembrance of a journey in the summer 1860) was written by Aasmund Olavsson Vinje.

Births
9 March – Monthei Eriksen Haug, politician
18 April – Christian Emil Stoud Platou, railroad director and politician (died 1923)
23 July – Hans Bergersen Wergeland, politician
10 October – Fridtjof Nansen, explorer, scientist and diplomat, awarded the Nobel Peace Prize in 1922 (died 1930)
21 December – Valentin Valentinsen, engineer and politician

Full date unknown
Pauline Fjelde, Norwegian-American painter, needlework artist and weaver.  (died 1923)
Ludvig Meyer, barrister, newspaper editor and politician (died 1938)
Olaf Norli, bookseller and publisher (died 1959)
Anton Thorkildsen Omholt, politician and Minister (died 1925)
Edvard Sverdrup, theologian (died 1923)

Deaths
22 January – Peder Klykken, politician (born 1772)
6 June – David Vogt, politician (born 1793)
16 October – Broder Lysholm Krohg, military officer and civil servant (born 1777)

References